Steven Wayne Jackson (born April 8, 1969) is a former American football defensive back for the Houston Oilers/Tennessee Titans who is the senior offensive assistant for the Atlanta Falcons of the National Football League (NFL). He was selected by Houston in the 3rd round (71st overall) in the 1991 NFL Draft. In 1999, the Titans made it to Super Bowl XXXIV in which Jackson appeared as a substitute; however, they lost to the Kurt Warner-led St. Louis Rams. In 2022, twenty-two years later, Jackson coached the Cincinnati Bengals secondary/cornerbacks in Super Bowl LVI, also losing to Los Angeles Rams.

Coaching career
In 2022, Jackson entered his 19th season as a coach and first season as a senior offensive assistant with the Atlanta Falcons. Formerly, all prior eighteen seasons were in a defensive capacity including most recently as a cornerbacks coach with the Cincinnati Bengals (2020-2021). He helped lead the team's secondary to Super Bowl LVI, after spending nine seasons as a player in the league (1991-99).

Previously, Jackson spent two seasons (2018-19) with the New York Jets, where he served as the team's assistant defensive backs coach. During his two seasons coaching the Jets DBs, he helped guide S Jamal Adams to consecutive Pro Bowl appearances and first-team AP All-Pro nods. Adams also led the Jets in tackles in both seasons, and was voted by his teammates both years as the Curtis Martin Team Most Valuable Player.

Prior to his time with the Jets, Jackson spent two seasons (2016-17) with the Tennessee Titans as the team's assistant secondary coach. In 2017, he helped guide S Kevin Byard, a third-round selection in ’16, to a standout season that included eight INTs (tied for NFL lead), a Pro Bowl nod and first-team All-Pro honors. Additionally, Jackson aided in the development of CB Adoree’ Jackson, Tennessee's first-round selection in 2017, who was thrust into immediate action as a full-time starter and ended his rookie season with a team-high 17 passes defensed and three FFs (tied for team lead).

Jackson served as assistant secondary coach for one season (2013) with the Detroit Lions, after spending eight years (’04-11) with the Washington Redskins as safeties coach (also added the title of defensive passing game coordinator from ’06-09). His time in Washington was perhaps best known for his work as the position coach for the late Sean Taylor, a 2004 Redskins first-round pick who became one of the NFL's top defensive players before dying tragically in ’07. Jackson was safeties coach for all four of Taylor's NFL seasons, overseeing a rapid development that earned Taylor first-team AP All-Pro and Pro Bowl honors before his untimely death at age 24.
Jackson began his NFL coaching career from 2001 to 2003 with the Buffalo Bills, where he served as safeties coach, with an added focus on the team's third- down defense.

Prior to his coaching career, Jackson played safety in the NFL for nine seasons (1991-99), all of which were with the Houston Oilers/Tennessee Titans. He entered the league as a third-round draft choice of the Oilers in 1991, and went on to post 14 career INTs and nine sacks. In his final season, he helped the Titans to an AFC Championship and concluded his career in Super Bowl XXXIV.

Before the NFL, Jackson was a four-year starter at Purdue University. As a senior, he earned All-American honors and was named semifinalist for the Jim Thorpe Award, given annually to the nation's top defensive back.

Jackson was born April 8, 1969, in Houston, Texas, and went on to attend Klein Forest High School in Houston. He has a daughter, Dominique, and a son, Stephen.

References

External links
NFL.com player page

1969 births
Living people
Sportspeople from Houston
American football cornerbacks
Players of American football from Houston
Purdue Boilermakers football players
Houston Oilers players
Tennessee Oilers players
Tennessee Titans players
St. Louis Rams coaches
Washington Redskins coaches
Tennessee Titans coaches
Cincinnati Bengals coaches
Atlanta Falcons coaches